The Arboretum de Contrexéville (0.7 hectares) is an arboretum located in the thermal park (constructed 1908) in the center of Contrexéville, Vosges, Grand Est, France. It contains walking paths and is open daily without charge.

See also 
 List of botanical gardens in France

References 
 Je Decouvre la France entry (French)
 L'Echo des Chênaies entry (French)
 Photograph of sequoias

Gardens in Vosges (department)
Contrexeville